A Cave Man Wooing is a 1912 American silent comedy short film starring King Baggot and directed by Otis Turner. It was produced by Independent Moving Pictures (IMP).

As of 2012, a print of this film survives, with Dutch intertitles, in the holdings of the EYE Film Institute Netherlands in Amsterdam.

Plot
George (King Baggot) a timid man who falls for the beautiful and athletic Clarice (Violet Horner). After taking a course in physical culture, George manages to overcome his rivals for Clarice's attention.

Cast 
King Baggot as George - the 'Sissy Hero'

Violet Horner as Clarice - George's Sweetheart

William Robert Daly as Prof. S. Trong (billed as William R. Daly)

William E. Shay as Sam

Jane Fearnley as The Annoyed Neighbor

References

External links
 

1912 films
Silent American comedy films
American silent short films
American black-and-white films
1912 short films
Films directed by Otis Turner
1912 comedy films
American comedy short films
1910s American films